Rakhe Hari Mare Ke is a 2003 Bengali romance drama film directed by Ratan Adhikari and produced by Pritam Jalan. The film features actors Prosenjit Chatterjee, Rachana Banerjee, Raima Sen in the lead roles. Music of the film has been composed by Babul Bose. The film is a remake of 1990 Tamil film Avasara Police 100.

Cast 
 Prosenjit Chatterjee
 Rachana Banerjee
 Raima Sen
 Laboni Sarkar
 Sabyasachi Chakraborty
 Subhasish Mukhopadhyay
 Rajesh Sharma
 Kaushik Banerjee
 Ramaprasad Banik
 Bhola Tamang

Soundtrack 
 Chokhe Chokhe Kotha Holo
 Cholechi Mora Desher Tore
 Katus Kutus
 Na Na Na Sono Na
 Piriter Oi Laal Pipra
 Tomake Jibon Bhore Bedhechi

References 

Bengali-language Indian films
2003 films
2000s Bengali-language films
Bengali remakes of Tamil films
Indian romantic drama films
Films scored by Babul Bose